The Electronic Filing System of the United States Patent and Trademark Office (USPTO), also referred to as EFS-Web or simply EFS, is a web-based system for submitting patent applications and related documents electronically. 

All users may file new applications for accelerated examination, design patents, design patent reissues, international applications for filing in the US receiving office, provisional applications, reexamination requests, utility patents under 35 U.S.C. § 111(a), utility patent reissues, U.S. National Stage applications under 35 U.S.C. § 371, ASCII text files (for sequence listings, computer listings, mega tables, mathematical formulae, chemical formulae, and 3D protein crystal structures), and petitions under 37 C.F.R. § 1.378(c). Applications must be in PDF format.

Users who have registered may also file follow-on documents and/or fees for previously filed applications, and pre-grant publications.

After filing via EFS, users are sent an electronic receipt that acknowledges the submission date. Submissions are available for viewing on Private PAIR within hours of submission.

See also
epoline, a set of web-based computer programs and services operated by the European Patent Office (EPO)

References
EFS-Web help (USPTO)
EFS FAQ (USPTO)

External links
USPTO Electronic Business Center, including EFS-Web

United States patent law